Allepipona erythrospila is a species of wasp in the Vespidae family. It was described by Cameron in 1905.

References

Potter wasps
Insects described in 1905